"Back to Life" is a song recorded by American country music group Rascal Flatts. It is their 39th single release overall, and its release is intended to be a standalone single, as opposed to their previous singles which were all included on studio albums. Cary Barlowe, Niko Moon, Shay Mooney, and Fred Wilhelm are the song's writers.

History
"Back to Life" was written by Cary Barlowe, Fred Wilhelm, Dan + Shay member Shay Mooney, and Sir Rosevelt member Niko Moon. The song is similar to many previous Rascal Flatts singles such as "Easy" and "Come Wake Me Up" by being a ballad with a 6/8 time signature. Rascal Flatts produced the song by themselves. Mooney said that the decision for Rascal Flatts to record the song came after they had been on tour with Dan + Shay.

Rolling Stone Country writer Jon Freeman said of the song that " glides on a gently swinging rhythm and lists a series of reasons large and small that create a sense of renewal in love, from dancing around the living room to falling asleep five minutes into a movie." Unlike previous Rascal Flatts singles, "Back to Life" is intended to be a standalone single, as opposed to being included on an album.

Chart performance

Weekly charts

Year-end charts

Certifications

References

2018 songs
2018 singles
Rascal Flatts songs
Songs written by Cary Barlowe
Songs written by Niko Moon
Songs written by Shay Mooney
Big Machine Records singles